Draško Brguljan (Serbian Cyrillic: Драшко Бргуљан; born 27 December 1984) is a Montenegrin water polo player who is a free agent. He was a member of the Montenegro men's national water polo team at the 2008 Summer Olympics. The team reached the semifinals, where they were defeated by Hungary before losing again to Serbia in the bronze medal match.  At the 2012 Summer Olympics, he again played for Montenegro, who were again defeated by Serbia in the bronze medal match, losing 11 - 12.

Brguljan was given the honour to carry the national flag of Montenegro at the opening ceremony of the 2020 Summer Olympics in Tokyo, becoming the 27th water polo player to be a flag bearer at the opening and closing ceremonies of the Olympics.

Club career

Clubs
  Primorac Kotor ( –2011)
  LACTIV-Vasas (2011–2014)
  A-HÍD OSC Újbuda (2014– )

See also
 Montenegro men's Olympic water polo team records and statistics
 List of flag bearers for Montenegro at the Olympics
 List of World Aquatics Championships medalists in water polo

References

External links
 

1984 births
Living people
Montenegrin male water polo players
Olympic water polo players of Montenegro
Water polo players at the 2008 Summer Olympics
Water polo players at the 2012 Summer Olympics
Water polo players at the 2016 Summer Olympics
Water polo players at the 2020 Summer Olympics
Montenegrin expatriate sportspeople in Hungary
Vasas SC water polo players
World Aquatics Championships medalists in water polo
Mediterranean Games bronze medalists for Serbia
Competitors at the 2005 Mediterranean Games
Mediterranean Games medalists in water polo
Competitors at the 2018 Mediterranean Games
Mediterranean Games bronze medalists for Montenegro